Central Croydon may refer to:

 The centre of Croydon, south London
 Central Croydon railway station, defunct station in Croydon 
 Croydon Central (UK Parliament constituency)